Léonard Jean Aubry Huard de Saint-Aubin (January 11, 1770 - September 7, 1812) was a French general of the First French Empire during the Napoleonic Wars. He was born in the department of Manche in Normandy. He started his military service in 1792. He was promoted to general de brigade (brigadier general) in 1807. He was killed in action at the Battle of Borodino at the age of 42.

References
 
 
 
 
 
 
 

1770 births
1812 deaths
Barons of the First French Empire
Commandeurs of the Légion d'honneur
Military personnel killed in the Napoleonic Wars
People from Manche
Generals of the First French Empire
Names inscribed under the Arc de Triomphe